The War memorials (Oise) or Monuments aux Morts of Oise are French war memorials commemorating those men of the region who died in World War I.

Background to the involvement of the Oise region in the 1914–18 war

The north eastern part of the Oise region, known as "Little Switzerland", was directly involved in World War I . From October 1914 to March 1917 the front had stabilised along a line passing through Lassigny, Tracy-le-Val and Bailly and during two years of occupation the German army lived in the towns and villages of the Noyon area.
In March 1917, in a tactical move, the Germans left the region as they moved north to the Hindenburg Line but they left much destruction in their wake. The areas which they vacated were then occupied by the Allied armies.  1918 saw the German "Spring Offensive" when the German army retook the area they had vacated and advanced even further. There were battles fought at Noyon and Mont Renaud in March and April 1918 and at Matz in June 1918, during the Third Battle of the Aisne. Further ferocious battles were fought until August 1918 when Montdidier and the Thiescourt were liberated. All of these efforts helped to stop the German advance on Paris and assisted the Allied success in pushing the Germans back to the Hindenburg Line in the summer and autumn.
Apart from the usual trench based skirmishes, the area around the front line suffered much damage and loss of life from constant artillery bombardment and bombing by Zeppelin airships and German aeroplanes. Great devastation was wrought in villages directly on the front line.  Ribecourt, Tracy-le-Val, Bailly, Chiry-Ourscamp, and Dreslincourt were almost totally destroyed. Compiègne and Noyon suffered much damage. One German long-range gun in particular, stationed in the forest at Coucy-le-Chateau, caused much devastation. The bombing reached as far as Beauvais where in June 1918, 36 soldiers and civilians were killed. Breteuil, Crèvecœur-le-Grand and Crépy-en-Valois were all hit by bombs.  Finally, the Armistice was signed at Rethondes on 11 November 1918

Some of the Monument aux Morts in the Oise

Below are details of just some of the many monuments aux morts in the Oise region.

Albert Bartholomé,the Crépy-en-Valois Monument aux Morts and other works

The following are photographs of the four high-reliefs:

The four bas-reliefs on this monument are the work of Émile Pinchon. The reliefs depict some aspects of Noyon's fate over the 4 years of the war.

 The taking of hostages by the Germans on 29 September 1914
 The re-entry of French troops of the 13th Corps on 18 March 1917
 The ruins of Noyon on 25 August 1918
 The presentation to the town of the Légion d'honneur and Croix de guerre on 10 July 1920 by Maréchal Joffre.

The Noyon war memorial was inaugurated on 22 March 1925.

Gallery

See also
World War I memorials
War memorials (Aisne)
War memorials (Eastern Somme)
War memorials (Western Somme)

Notes

External links
Sites of Memory (Historical markers, memorials, monuments, and cemeteries worldwide)
FranceGenWeb - Source of information on war memorial 
National Archives article on the Ferme de Navarin (See Maxime Real del Sarte above)

Sculptures in France
World War I memorials in France

fr:Monument aux morts